In physics, coherence theory is the study of optical effects arising from partially coherent light and radio sources. Partially coherent sources are sources where the coherence time or coherence length are limited by bandwidth, by thermal noise, or by other effect. Many aspects of modern coherence theory are studied in quantum optics.

The theory of partial coherence was awoken in the 1930s due to work by Pieter Hendrik van Cittert and Frits Zernike.

Topics in coherence theory
 Visibility
 Mutual coherence function
 Degree of coherence
 Self coherence function
 Coherence function
 Low frequency fluctuations
 General interference law
 Van Cittert–Zernike theorem
 Michelson stellar interferometer
 Correlation interferometry
 Hanbury–Brown and Twiss effect
 Phase-contrast microscope
 Pseudothermal light
 Englert–Greenberger duality relation
 Coherence Collapse

See also
 Nonclassical light
 Optical coherence tomography

References
 Eugene Hecht and Alfred Zajac, Optics, (1974) Addison-Wesley Publishing, Reading, Massachusetts . (Chapter 12 provides an undergraduate level introduction.)

Interferometry
Physical optics